Danish national road 21 is a road going from Copenhagen, Denmark to Randers, Denmark.

 1 Hvidovre
 Brøndby  Helsingør
 2 Brøndbyvester 
 3 Vallensbæk N
 Vallensbæk  Odense, Rødby, Gedser
 4 Roskildevej Ø 
 5 Roskildevej V 
 Taastrup  Ballerup, Lyngby
 6 Høje Taastrup C´
 7a Høje Taastrup S 
 7b Baldersbrønde
 8 Fløng
 9 Trekroner
 10 Roskilde Ø 
 11 Roskilde SØ 
 12 Roskilde S   | Service area Roskilde
 13 Ringstedvej 
 14 Roskilde V
| Kornerup
 15 Gevninge  
| Service area Torkildstrup
 16 Kirke Sonnerup 
 Holbæk  Kalundborg 
| Arnakke
 18 Holbæk Ø  
 19 Holbæk C   
|  Springstrup
 20 Holbæk V  

Expressway begins
 Asnæs 
 Vig
 Nykøbing Sjælland 
Expressway ends
 
 -Ebeltoft (Mols-Linien)
 Ebeltoft
 
 Mørke
  
 ends

References 

Roads in Denmark